Franco Marcelo Ragusa Nappe (born 22 July 1993) is a Chilean footballer that currently plays at Chilean Primera División club C.D. Cobresal in Chile as central midfielder or also as forward.

External links
 Franco Ragusa at Football-Lineups
 
 

1993 births
Living people
Chilean footballers
Chilean expatriate footballers
Chile under-20 international footballers
Chilean people of Italian descent
Everton de Viña del Mar footballers
Deportes Concepción (Chile) footballers
Rangers de Talca footballers
Zamora CF footballers
Cobresal footballers
Chilean Primera División players
Primera B de Chile players
Tercera División players
Association football forwards
Association football midfielders
Sportspeople from Viña del Mar
Chilean expatriate sportspeople in Spain
Expatriate footballers in Spain